Xerosicyos is a flowering plant genus of the family Cucurbitaceae. Its name comes from Greek xeros (meaning "dry") and sicyos ("cucumber"). There are three species, all endemic to Madagascar.  Xerosicyos danguyi is a large liana with thick stems and round, gray succulent leaves.  It is common in cultivation and often called the "silver dollar" vine.  Xerosicyos perrieri is also a liana with thinner stems and smaller, ovate green succulent leaves.  Xerosicyos pubescens is entirely different from the previous species.  It forms a large caudex from which deciduous vines emerge. The leaves are lobed and semi-succulent and die back in the dry season and during prolonged periods of drought.

References 

Cucurbitaceae genera
Cucurbitaceae
Taxa named by Jean-Henri Humbert